Goodfish Lake is a First Nation's Reserve in northern Alberta within the Goodfish Reserve of the Whitefish Lake First Nation.

Localities on Indian reserves in Alberta